Daniel Leary (born May 18, 1978 in Clovis, New Mexico), better known as Danny Leary, is an American stand-up comedian and actor based in New York City. He attended Portales High School in Portales, New Mexico. He continued his studies at Eastern New Mexico University.

He has appeared on the CW-11 morning news, the Joey Reynolds Radio Show and Here! TV's Hot Gay Comics as a featured comedian. He also hosts a weekly cabaret and comedy revue called On the Rocks with Danny Leary at the Duplex in Greenwich Village and regularly performs at other New York venues including Comix comedy club, Broadway Comedy Club, Laugh Lounge, New York Comedy Club, New York Improv, and Stand-Up NY. The Karith Foster show on Shovio.com also frequently features him as a guest host.

As an improvization and sketch artist, Danny has performed at Upright Citizens Brigade, People's Improv Theatre, the Second City NY, National Comedy Theatre, 78th Street Theatre, and the Laurie Beechman Theatre.

External links
 Cabaret Exchange editorial by Scott Barbarino
 Cabaret Exchange review
 Danny Leary on Shovio.com

1978 births
Male actors from New York (state)
American stand-up comedians
Living people
People from Portales, New Mexico
Eastern New Mexico University alumni
Comedians from New York (state)
People from Clovis, New Mexico
21st-century American comedians